An American Dream: The Life of an African American Soldier and POW Who Spent Twelve Years in Communist China is a memoir by Corporal Clarence Adams posthumously published by the University of Massachusetts Press and edited by Della Adams and Louis H. Carlson.

Summary 
Adams was one of 21 Americans who refused repatriation to the United States in favor of going to China after being a POW during the Korean War.  The book follows Adams's youth in Memphis, Tennessee through his time in the Korean War as a POW and his return to Memphis with his Chinese wife and children.  It deals heavily with race relations in the South in both the 1930s and 1940s of Adams's youth and following his return to the US in 1966 during the Civil Rights Movement as well as the red scare of the Cold War.  Throughout the book, Adams cites racism, lack of opportunity, and curiosity as his main reasons for defecting and maintained his right to do so despite investigations into and questioning of his activities in China by the FBI.

Related books 
Adams's autobiography is one of three books dedicated to the 21 Americans who chose to go to China rather than repatriate to the United States.  The first book, 21 Stayed: The Story of the American GIs Who Chose Communist China, by Virginia Pasley is a largely unsympathetic account of the twenty published not long after they first went over to China.  The book is divided into chapters by the soldier discussed and based on interviews with the family of the soldiers and those who knew them and prefaced by information provided by the US military on the soldiers and accounts of their activities in POW camps.  The second book written was Morris Wills's memoir, Turncoat: An American's 12 Years in Communist China.  Written during the Vietnam War, Wills's biography is more sympathetic to the twenty one than Pasley's account but somewhat apologetic and still provides a rather negative in regards to the Chinese Communists.  Adams's book is far less apologetic than Wills's and provides a less negative portrait of the Chinese.

See also
 Samuel David Hawkins
 James Veneris

Five other American servicemen are known to have defected to North Korea after the war.  They are:

Jerry Wayne Parrish
Charles Robert Jenkins
James Joseph Dresnok
Larry Allen Abshier
Joseph White

References

Further reading
An American Dream : The Life of an African American Soldier and POW Who Spent Twelve Years in Communist China, by Clarence Adams.  .
Turncoat: An American's 12 Years in Communist China, by Morris Wills and J. Robert Moskin.
21 Stayed: The Story of the American GIs Who Chose Communist China, by Virginia Pasley.

External links
They Chose China, NFB documentary (2005) on American POW's who chose to stay in China
Profile of Clarence Adams

African-American autobiographies
American memoirs
2007 non-fiction books
Books published posthumously
University of Massachusetts Press books